Tanz der Lemminge is a double LP by the German rock band Amon Düül II which was released in 1971. It is their third studio album.

In the Q and Mojo Classic Special Edition Pink Floyd & The Story of Prog Rock, the album was listed as number 36 in its list of "40 Cosmic Rock Albums".

Track listing

Side A
"SYNTELMAN'S MARCH OF THE ROARING SEVENTIES"  – 15:51

Side B
"RESTLESS SKYLIGHT-TRANSISTOR-CHILD"  – 19:33

Side C
"CHAMSIN SOUNDTRACK"  -  18:05

Side D
"CHAMSIN SOUNDTRACK"- 14.59

Personnel

Amon Düül II
 Chris Karrer – acoustic guitar, electric guitar, violin, vocals on "Pull Down Your Mask" and "Little Tornadoes"
 John Weinzierl – guitars, vocals on "Paralyzed Paradise", piano (sides C & D)
 Falk Rogner – organ & electronics (sides C & D)
 Lothar Meid – bass, double-bass (sides A & B), vocals on "A Short Stop at the Transylvanian Brain-Surgery" and "Riding on a Cloud"
 Peter Leopold – drums, percussion (sides A & B), piano (sides C & D)
 Karl-Heinz Hausmann – electronics & sound engineer (sides A & B), mix & remix (sides C & D)

Guests
 Jimmy Jackson – organ, choir-organ, piano (sides A & B)
 Al Gromer – sitar (sides A & B)
 Renate Knaup-Krötenschwanz – vocals on "Riding on a Cloud" *
 Rolf Zacher – vocals on "H.G. Wells' Take Off"

(•) Renate Knaup was previously a band member, but listed as a guest for this album; she returned as a full member on the next album.

Technical
 Olaf Kübler – producer
 Peter Kramper – engineer
 Jürgen Kopper – remix engineer

References

1971 albums
Amon Düül II albums
United Artists Records albums